Sir Frederick Tilney (died 1445) Lord of Ashwellthorpe, Norfolk, and Boston, Lincolnshire, England, was the husband of Elizabeth Cheney, Lady Say and father of Elizabeth Tilney, Countess of Surrey. He is notably the great-grandfather of Anne Boleyn and Catherine Howard, two of the wives of King Henry VIII of England, and also the great-great-grandfather to Queen Elizabeth I, the daughter of Henry VIII and Anne Boleyn.

Family
He the eldest son of Sir Philip Tilney and Isabel Thorpe. He made his principal residence at Ashwellthorpe Manor, inheriting his father's titles which were originally earned during the Siege of Acre amidst the Third Crusade. He had about six siblings, one of whom was a younger brother, Hugh Tilney, who was the father of Agnes Tilney. Agnes would be the second wife to Frederick's daughter's husband, Thomas Howard.

Marriage and issue
On an unknown date, Frederick married his wife Elizabeth Cheney,  the eldest child of Lawrence Cheney (c. 1396 – 1461), High Sheriff of Cambridgeshire, and his wife, Elizabeth ( Cokayne). They only had one daughter:
Elizabeth Tilney (before 1445 – 4 April 1497), married firstly in about 1466, Sir Humphrey Bourchier, by whom she had three children; and secondly on 30 April 1472, Thomas Howard, Earl of Surrey, who later became the 2nd Duke of Norfolk, by whom she had nine children. These children included Thomas Howard, 3rd Duke of Norfolk, Elizabeth Howard, mother of Anne Boleyn, and Lord Edmund Howard, father of Catherine Howard.

Death
His death left his young daughter Elizabeth as heiress to his estates. His widowed wife Elizabeth Cheney went on to marry again one year later to Sir John Say of Broxbourne, Speaker of the House of Commons, and a member of the household of King Henry VI.

Ancestry

References

1445 deaths
15th-century English nobility
Year of birth unknown
People from Ashwellthorpe and Fundenhall